Mark Knoll (born July 26, 1976) is a Canadian former speed skater and schoolteacher. He twice took part in the Winter Olympic Games.

He went to the 1998 Winter Olympics, competing in the men's 5000 metres in speed skating and finishing 24th. He competed again in the 2002 Winter Olympics in the same category and finished 18th.

He is married to Dutch skater Tonny de Jong. They have had three children: Ryder Knoll, Nico Knoll, and Jasper Knoll.

He is currently a teacher at Westmount Charter School and resides in Calgary.

Personal records

References

1976 births
Canadian male speed skaters
Living people
Olympic speed skaters of Canada
Speed skaters at the 1998 Winter Olympics
Speed skaters at the 2002 Winter Olympics
Sportspeople from Regina, Saskatchewan